Oliver Bond flats, also known as Oliver Bond House, is a group of blocks of flats in the Liberties area of Dublin, Ireland. They were designed by Herbert George Simms and built in 1936. They are named after Oliver Bond, a member of the Society of United Irishmen.

Buildings
The buildings were designed with Art Deco trimmings and are named alphabetically from A to T with the letters I, J, K and Q omitted. The site is bounded by Oliver Bond Street, Bridgefoot Street, Ussher Street and Ussher's Quay.

History

Before the flats
The area used to be the site of a brewery called The Anchor which was founded in 1740. This was later owned by a son of Daniel O'Connell. Rivalry with the Guinness Brewery was intense, even extending to politics – in the 1841 election there was a boycott of Guinness "Protestant porter".

Employment
Many residents were employed in local factories, such as a mattress factory on Manor Street, a matchstick factory, sewing factories or the Winstanley shoe factory. There was a popular belief that the residents were all employed in the Guinness Brewery, but according to a resident this is not true. The area was always poor, but there was plenty of employment for decades and though people could not always afford what they made, shoe factory employees could get shoes.

One resident was an Irish Army soldier who served in the United Nations Operation in the Congo and survived the Niemba ambush.

Many factories closed in the 1970 and 1980s, leaving only a factory that makes clothing labels.

80th anniversary celebrations
Local residents collected an archive of materials relating to the history of the flats, including personal photos. They also held talks on Herbert Simms and the role of public housing in Irish society.

Crime
Residents have complained to the Garda Síochána about heroin and crack cocaine dealing in the flats. It is connected to the Kinahan gang.

After the murder of Eddie Hutch Snr, part of the Kinahan-Hutch feud, friends and relatives of the Kinahans living in the flats were advised to move out of their homes.

References

External links
Oliver Bond Flats (C,D, E & F Blocks) - Children & Young People's Services Committees
Oliver Bond St. Flats (R,S & T Blocks) - Children & Young People's Services Committees
Oliver Bond House Estate Renewal www.dublincity.ie

Buildings and structures in Dublin (city)
Apartment buildings in the Republic of Ireland
Art Deco architecture in the Republic of Ireland